Valentyna Maslovska (30 January 1937 – 2002) was a Ukrainian sprinter. She competed in the women's 200 metres at the 1960 Summer Olympics representing the Soviet Union.

References

External links
 

1937 births
2002 deaths
Athletes (track and field) at the 1960 Summer Olympics
Ukrainian female sprinters
Olympic athletes of the Soviet Union
Place of birth missing
Soviet female sprinters
Olympic female sprinters